G8 is the Group of Eight, an international forum for eight industrialized nations, also known as the G7+1.

G8, G08, G.VIII, G.8, G-8, or Group of Eight may also refer to:

Airlines
 Air Service Gabon, IATA airline designator(s) G8/X7
 Enkor, IATA airline designator(s) G8(G5)
 Go First, IATA airline designator G8
 Gujarat Airways (India), IATA airline designator G8

Arts, entertainment, and media
 G-8 (character), a fictional aviator
 Group of Eight (music), a Spanish group close to the Generation of '27

Organizations
 G8, the Contadora group and the Contadora support group, taken as a whole
 Group of Eight (Australian universities), an association of Australian universities

Roads
 G-08 (Michigan county highway)
 County Route G8 (California), a route from Santa Clara County to San Jose, California, USA

Transportation
 EMD G8, a diesel locomotive and derivatives thereof
 Fiat G.8, a 1934 Italian military utility aircraft 
 Gabardini G.8, a 1923 Italian fighter and military trainer aircraft
 Gotha G.VIII, a 1918 German bomber aircraft 
 Pontiac G8, a full-size automobile from the Pontiac lineup of GM
 BMW iX3 (G08), a compact crossover SUV

Other uses
 G8 star, a subclass of G-class stars
 Abitur after twelve years, often abbreviated "G8", a secondary education system in Germany
 Gewehr-8 or G-8, the designation of the Heckler & Koch HK21 by the German Army, German Navy and the Federal Police
 NATO code for the Assistant Chief-of-Staff, Finance

See also 
G7
 Gang of Eight, a colloquial term for a set of eight leaders of the U.S. Congress
 Gang of Eight (Soviet Union), the eight hardliners who attempted a coup against Mikhail Gorbachev in August 1991
 Group 8 element of the periodic table